Osvaldo Dorticós Torrado (17 April 1919 – 23 June 1983) was a Cuban politician who served as the president of Cuba from 1959 to 1976. He was a close ally of Cuban revolutionary and longtime leader Fidel Castro.

Background
Dorticós was born to a wealthy family in Cienfuegos, Las Villas Province, on 17 April 1919.  His father was both a lawyer and a physician, and one of his ancestors was Tomas Terry, a famous Venezuelan-born entrepreneur of paternal Irish descent who amassed one of the largest fortunes in the Western Hemisphere ($25 million at the time of his death in 1886), who established the  Thomas Terry Theatre in Cienfuegos. After working briefly as a teacher, Dorticós studied law and philosophy at the University of Havana, graduating with a law degree in 1941. He joined the Communist-controlled Popular Socialist Party, and acted for a time as secretary to Juan Marinello, the party's leader.

In the 1950s, Dorticós established a prosperous law practice in Cienfuegos, and served as Commodore of the Cienfuegos Yacht Club. He strongly opposed the government of Fulgencio Batista, and participated in the Civil Resistance Movement, supplying the rebel forces with arms and supplies. Dorticós was elected dean of the Cuban Bar Association in 1958 prior to being arrested by the Batista regime in the same year and being briefly exiled to Mexico.

Roles in government
After the success of the Revolution on 1 January 1959, Dorticós returned to Cuba and was appointed Minister of Revolutionary Laws in the cabinet headed by Fidel Castro. In that capacity, he played an important role in drafting revolutionary legislation such as the Agrarian Reform Act and the Fundamental Organic Law that supplanted the Constitution of 1940. After the resignation of President Manuel Urrutia, Dorticós was appointed President of Cuba by the Council of Ministers on 17 July 1959. 

As President, Dorticós represented Cuba at the Summit of Non-Aligned Nations in Belgrade, Yugoslavia (1961), and at the Summit of the Organisation of American States in Punta del Este, Uruguay (1962). During the Cuban Missile Crisis of 1962, Dorticós gave a speech at the United Nations in which he announced that Cuba possessed nuclear weapons, which it hoped would never be used. He was present at the inauguration of Peronist President Héctor Cámpora on 25 May 1973, in Buenos Aires, along with Chilean President Salvador Allende.

In addition to being Cuba's President, Dorticós served as a member of the Secretariat of the Central Committee of the Communist Party of Cuba (from 1965); and as president of the Central Planning Council (from 1964). For the most part, Dorticós was a figurehead, with most of the real power held by Prime Minister Fidel Castro.

A new constitution enacted in 1976 merged the posts of president and prime minister. Castro became president, and Dorticós was named President of the National Bank and a member of the Council of State.

Death 
Dorticós shot himself on 23 June 1983. His suicide was apparently brought on by the death of his wife, as well as chronic spinal disease.

See also

 Communist Party of Cuba

References

Further reading

The Great Soviet Encyclopaedia, 3rd ed., vol. 8.
The New York Times, 20 July 1959.
Red Star Over Cuba by Nathaniel Weyl (1961).
The New York Times, 26 January 1962, refers to Dorticós' speech at the summit of American foreign ministers at Punta del Este on 25 January 1962, in which he accused the U.S. of creating "conditions for a new physical and military aggression" against Cuba.
Fidel: A Critical Portrait by Tad Szulc (2000), contains a reference to Dorticós' speech at the U.N. on 8 October 1962, in which he said that "...we have indeed our inevitable weapons, the weapons which we would have preferred not to acquire and which we do not wish to employ."
Revolution in Cuba: An Essay in Understanding by Herbert Matthews (1975).
Che Guevara: A Revolutionary Life by Jon Lee Anderson (1997).

1919 births
1983 deaths
People from Cienfuegos
Popular Socialist Party (Cuba) politicians
Communist Party of Cuba politicians
Presidents of Cuba
People of the Cuban Revolution
Cuban people of Irish descent
1950s in Cuba
1960s in Cuba
1970s in Cuba
20th-century Cuban politicians
University of Havana alumni
Heads of state who committed suicide
Cuban politicians who committed suicide
Suicides by firearm in Cuba